James White Humphrey (1832–1898) was a convict transported to Western Australia, and later became one of the colony's ex-convict school teachers.

Born in the United Kingdom in 1832, Humphrey worked as a clerk until convicted of forgery and sentenced to transportation.  Erickson states that he was transported for life, but other records state fifteen years.  Humphrey arrived in Western Australia on board the Stag in 1855, and received his ticket of leave two years later.  For some time he was self-employed in Perth before working for William Locke Brockman until 1860, when he received a conditional pardon.  In 1863 Humphrey was appointed to a teaching post at Quindalup, and the following year he married Mary (Bertha) Tapping at Fremantle.  When his request for a salary increase was refused in 1868, he resigned as a teacher and spent the next five years working as a postmaster, bootmaker and agent at Quindalup.  He then spent two years working as an auctioneer and agent at Fremantle.  From 1875 to 1878 he was headmaster at Newcastle, then worked as an accountant in Perth for some time.  In 1885 he advertised himself as a storekeeper in Perth.  Ten years later he visited Melbourne before returning to live in the Canning district.  He died in 1898.

References
 

1832 births
1898 deaths
Australian schoolteachers
Convicts transported to Western Australia
Settlers of Western Australia
Australian auctioneers
19th-century Australian businesspeople